Éric Aimé Batinga (born 8 April 1989) is a footballer who plays as a right back for Equatorial Guinean league club Deportivo Niefang.

Born in Cameroon, he was a member, as a naturalized citizen, of the Equatorial Guinea national team.

Career
Batinga was a member of the Deportivo Mongomo's squad in the 2011 CAF Champions League.

International career
Batinga made his debut with the Equatoguinean national team on 29 March 2011, when he played a friendly match against Gambia.

References

External links

Official profile on Facebook

1989 births
Living people
Association football fullbacks
Cameroonian footballers
Footballers from Douala
Cameroonian expatriate footballers
Cameroonian expatriate sportspeople in Gabon
Expatriate footballers in Gabon
Cameroonian emigrants to Equatorial Guinea
Naturalized citizens of Equatorial Guinea
Equatoguinean footballers
Equatorial Guinea international footballers
Equatorial Guinea youth international footballers
Equatoguinean people of Cameroonian descent
Deportivo Mongomo players
Deportivo Niefang players